Andrei Vladimirovich Shevtsov (born 13 December 1961) is a Russian former professional footballer.

Club career
He made his professional debut in the Soviet Second League in 1977 for FC Sokol Saratov. He played 1 game in the UEFA Cup 1982–83 for FC Dynamo Moscow.

Honours
 Soviet Cup winner: 1984.
 Soviet Cup finalist: 1990.

References

1961 births
Living people
Sportspeople from Saratov
Russian footballers
Soviet footballers
FC Dynamo Moscow players
Soviet Top League players
FC Lokomotiv Moscow players
FC Sokol Saratov players
Association football forwards
Association football midfielders